The attack on the Israeli embassy in Buenos Aires was a suicide bombing attack on the building of the Israeli embassy of Argentina, located in Buenos Aires, which was carried out on 17 March 1992. 29 civilians were killed in the attack and 242 additional civilians were injured.

The attack

On 17 March 1992, at 2:42 pm (UTC−3), a pick-up truck driven by a suicide bomber and loaded with explosives smashed into the front of the Israeli Embassy located on the corner of Arroyo and Suipacha, and detonated. The embassy, a Catholic church, and a nearby school building were destroyed. Four Israelis died, but most of the victims were Argentine civilians, many of them children. The blast killed 29 and wounded 242. It was Argentina's deadliest terror attack until the 1994 AMIA bombing and it remains the deadliest attack on an Israeli diplomatic mission.

Fatalities
Priest Juan Carlos Brumana was one of the people killed in the suicide bombing. He died in the Catholic Church Mater Admirabilis that is in front of the embassy. Among the dead there were two Israeli women who were the wives of the embassy's consul and first secretary.

Responsibility
A group called Islamic Jihad Organization, which has been linked to Iran and possibly Hezbollah, claimed responsibility; their stated motive for the attack was Israel's assassination of Hezbollah Secretary General Sayed Abbas al-Musawi in February 1992. Islamic Jihad also released surveillance footage they took of the embassy before the blast.

After the bombing, Israel sent investigators to Argentina to search for clues. They learned that the bombers planned the attack in the Tri-Border area, where the borders of Argentina, Paraguay, and Brazil meet and which has a large Muslim population. Messages intercepted by the American National Security Agency revealed Iranian knowledge of the impending attack, as well as the complicity of Hezbollah operative Imad Mughniyah. In fact, Mughniyah was formally charged by Argentina with participating in the bombings of the Israeli embassy.

In May 1998, Moshen Rabbani (the Cultural Attaché in the Iranian Embassy in Argentina until December 1997) was detained in Germany, and the Argentine government expelled seven Iranian diplomats from the country, stating that it had "convincing proof" of Iranian involvement in the bombing. However, none of the suspects were prosecuted. The attack occurred when Iran and Argentina were hoping for a resumption of nuclear cooperation, although Argentina had announced the suspension of the shipments of nuclear materials to Iran a couple months before the bombing. A number of sources report on Hezbollah involvement with the assistance of Syria. Hezbollah denies these claims.

In 1999, the Argentine government issued an arrest warrant for Imad Mughniyah in connection with this attack and the 1994 AMIA bombing in Buenos Aires, which killed 85. It is suspected that the two attacks are linked.

Aftermath

Kirchner on the case
When he was president, Néstor Kirchner pronounced that allowing these two incidents to happen, with no real inquiries to be followed, equalled a "national disgrace". He reopened, and kept open files from these incidents, most to be read by Justice Juan Jose Galeano. In the same process Kirchner hoped to lift the ban for former Intelligence Officers (Argentine) to testify. A former president of Argentina (his widow, Cristina Fernández de Kirchner) also claimed that she wanted to get to the bottom of the case. Argentinian federal prosecutor, Alberto Nisman, was assigned to investigate the bombing, but one day before he was scheduled to report on his findings, he was found dead in his home on 18 January 2015.

Commemoration
Today there is a memorial set up in place of where the building stood. In the memorial plaza stand twenty one trees and seven benches in memory of the victims. A plaque describing the event and listing the victims is located in the memorial in both Hebrew and Spanish.

See also

1994 London Israeli Embassy bombing
Alas Chiricanas Flight 901, a bomb brought down a Panamanian plane the day after the AMIA bombing, dead included 12 Jews
Argentina–Israel relations
History of the Jews in Argentina
List of unsolved murders
Secretariat of Intelligence
Terrorism in Argentina

References

Sources
Bergman, Ronen. The Secret War with Iran: The 30-Year Clandestine Struggle Against the World's Most Dangerous Terrorist Power. Simon and Schuster, 2008.

External links

Context of 'March 17, 1992: Israeli Embassy in Buenos Aires Is Bombed, Hezbollah and Iran Accused Despite Lack of Evidence'  -History Commons

1990s in Buenos Aires
1992 in Argentina
1992 in international relations
1992 in Israel
Suicide bombings in 1992
Antisemitism in Argentina
Argentina–Iran relations
Argentina–Israel relations
Iran–Israel proxy conflict
Attacks on diplomatic missions in Argentina
Attacks on diplomatic missions of Israel
History of Buenos Aires
Islamic terrorism in Argentina
Islamic Shia terrorism
Islamic terrorist incidents in 1992
Jewish Argentine history
Jews and Judaism in Buenos Aires
March 1992 events in South America
March 1992 crimes
Mass murder in 1992
Presidency of Carlos Menem
School bombings
South Lebanon conflict (1985–2000)
Suicide car and truck bombings in Argentina
Terrorist incidents in Argentina in the 1990s
Terrorist incidents in Argentina
Argentina
Unsolved murders in Argentina
Building bombings in South America
Hezbollah attacks